Leonardo de Vinci University Center (French: Pôle universitaire Léonard de Vinci), is a French private university cluster located at La Défense.

History 
The Leonardo de Vinci University Center, a higher education University center, has been created in 1995 by the Hauts-de-Seine general council, managed by Charles Pasqua: it is thus often colloquially nicknamed the “Pasqua University" (Fac Pasqua).

The cluster was a private French higher education. Originally, it was financed mainly by public funds. The cluster is now managed by the Leonardo da Vinci Association (ALDV) and no longer receives any subsidy from the Hauts-de-Seine. The cluster has been managed by Pascal Brouaye since 2012.

The Leonardo de Vinci University Center has been EESPIG certified since January 10, 2018.

Organisation and administration 
The Leonardo de Vinci University Center  is a building belonging to the Hauts-de-Seine department inside which there are several occupants who have signed an annual precarious occupation agreement with the Hauts-de-Seine department:

 The Leonardo da Vinci Association made up of four schools and educational departments and transversal administrative services. The Leonardo da Vinci Association also has a subsidiary specializing in continuing education and business services, and an apprenticeship training center, the CFA Sup de Vinci.
 EMLV Business School De Vinci
 ESILV Engineering School De Vinci
 IIM Digital School De Vinci
 Leonardo da Vinci Institute
 Paris-Dauphine University
 Paris-Nanterre University
 SKEMA Business School
 CFA Sup de Vinci

Notable faculty 
 Oliver Günther, President of the University of Potsdam;
 Andrew Simoncelli, professor of Mass communication.

References

External links 
 Official website

Universities in Île-de-France
La Défense
Educational institutions established in 1995
1995 establishments in France